De'Jon Raiheem "Scoota" Harris (born November 1, 1997) is an American football linebacker for the Washington Commanders of the National Football League (NFL). He played college football at Arkansas. Harris has also been a member of the New England Patriots and Green Bay Packers.

College career
Harris played in 47 games for Arkansas recording 371 tackles with 26 tackles for loss and 7.5 sacks.

Professional career

New England Patriots
Harris was signed by the New England Patriots as an undrafted free agent on April 26, 2020. He was waived on September 5, 2020.

Green Bay Packers
Harris was signed by the Green Bay Packers to their practice squad on September 9, 2020. He was elevated to the active roster on October 5 and November 28 for the team's weeks 4 and 12 games against the Atlanta Falcons and Chicago Bears, and reverted to the practice squad after each game. On January 25, 2021, Harris signed a reserve/futures contract with the Packers. On August 31, 2021, Packers released Harris as part of their final roster cuts.

Washington Football Team / Commanders
Harris signed with the Washington Football Team's practice squad on October 19, 2021. He was elevated to the active roster as a COVID-19 replacement player against the Philadelphia Eagles in Week 15. Harris was signed to the active roster on January 3, 2022.

Harris was released by the Commanders on August 31, 2022, and re-signed to the practice squad two days later. He was signed to the active roster on November 3. On December 22, he was waived then re-signed to the practice squad four days later and promoted again to the active roster on December 30. On January 4, 2023, Harris was placed on injured reserve.

Personal life
Harris' nickname Scoota given to him by his mother when he was a baby.

References

External links

Washington Commanders bio
Arkansas Razorbacks bio

1997 births
Living people
People from Harvey, Louisiana
Players of American football from Louisiana
American football linebackers
Arkansas Razorbacks football players
Green Bay Packers players
Washington Commanders players
Washington Football Team players